Yolandi is a given name. People with that name include:
 Yolandi Visser (born 1984), female vocalist in the South African rap-rave group Die Antwoord
 Yolandi van der Westhuizen (1981–), international cricketer for South Africa
 Yolandi Potgieter (born 1989), South African cricketer
 Yolandi Du Toit (born 1985), road cyclist from South Africa

See also
 Yolanda (disambiguation)